The 1992 London Monarchs season was the second season for the franchise in the World League of American Football (WLAF). The team was led by head coach Ray Willsey in his first year, and played its home games at Wembley Stadium in London, England. They finished the season in third place of the European Division with a record of two wins, seven losses and one tie.

Offseason

World League draft

Personnel

Staff

Roster

Schedule

Standings

Game summaries

Week 1: vs New York/New Jersey Knights

Week 2: vs Frankfurt Galaxy

Week 3: at Barcelona Dragons

Week 4: vs Birmingham Fire

Week 5: vs Barcelona Dragons

References

London Monarchs seasons